"Elita" is a song performed by British singer-songwriter Gary Barlow, Canadian singer-songwriter Michael Bublé and Colombian singer-songwriter Sebastián Yatra. It was released in the United Kingdom on 30 September 2020 as the lead single from Barlow's fifth solo album, Music Played by Humans.

Personnel
Credits adapted from Tidal.
 Andres Munera – producer, additional producer, associated performer, programming, recording engineer, studio personnel
 Andrés Guerrero Ruiz – producer, additional producer, associated performer, programming, recording engineer, studio personnel
 Fernando Tobon – producer, 12-string acoustic guitar, additional producer, associated performer, electric guitar, programming
 Gary Barlow – producer, composer, lyricist, additional producer, associated performer, programming, vocals
 Johan Carlsson – producer, associated performer, background vocalist, baritone guitar, drum programming, electric guitar, guitar, percussion, piano, programming, vocal producer
 Ryan Carline – producer, additional producer, associated performer, piano, programming, recording engineer, studio personnel
 Sebastián Yatra – producer, composer, lyricist, additional producer, associated performer
 Jean Rodríguez – composer, lyricist, vocals
 Michael Bublé – composer, lyricist, associated performer, vocals
 Amy Stewart – associated performer, orchestra conductor
 Ash Soan – associated performer, percussion
 James Wiltshire – associated performer, drum programming
 Justin Quinn – associated performer, nylon-string guitar
 Peter Karlsson – associated performer, background vocalist, vocal producer
 Tom Richards – associated performer, conductor, horn arranger
 Randy Merrill – mastering engineer, studio personnel
 John Hanes – mix engineer, studio personnel
 Serban Ghenea – mixer, studio personnel
 Mat Bartram – recording engineer, studio personnel

Charts

References

2020 singles
2020 songs
Gary Barlow songs
Michael Bublé songs
Sebastián Yatra songs
Polydor Records singles
Songs written by Gary Barlow
Songs written by Michael Bublé
Songs written by Sebastián Yatra